An Alarm to Awaken the Age or The Alarm Bell, also translated as A Bell to Warn the World, The Eternal Warning Bell, is a book written by Chen Tianhua that propagates the revolution against Manchu dynasty. It was published in 1903 in Tokyo, Japan.

An Alarm to Awaken the Age had a great impact at that time and was widely circulated. Chen denounced the crimes of the imperialist invasion of China and the traitorous acts of the Qing government.  Subsequently, the book was banned by the Qing government.

References

1903 non-fiction books
Political books